Mściwój or Mściwoj is a very old Polish given name of Slavic origin, consists of two elements: mści "vengeance" and woj, derived from: wojna (war), wojownik (warrior) or wuj (uncle).  A related name is: Mścisław. The Pomeranian form is Mestwin.

List of people with the given name Mściwój
Mestwin (Mściwoj) I, Duke of Pomerania
Mestwin (Mściwoj) II, Duke of Pomerania
 Mszczuj of Skrzynno, Polish knight

Slavic masculine given names
Polish masculine given names